Abacetus ambiguus is a species of ground beetle in the subfamily Pterostichinae. It was described by Straneo in 1969 and is an endemic species found in Cote d'Ivoire, Africa.

References

ambiguus
Beetles described in 1969
Insects of West Africa